Yao Wenxu (姚文绪; 1924 - 18 February 2010) was the chairman of the Hainan Provincial Committee of the Chinese People's Political Consultative Conference from August 1988 to February 1993. He was from Wafangdian, Liaoning. He was also a member of the 13th and 14th National Congresses of the Chinese Communist Party.

1924 births
2010 deaths
People's Republic of China politicians from Liaoning
Chinese Communist Party politicians from Liaoning
Political office-holders in Hainan
People from Wafangdian
Members of the 8th Chinese People's Political Consultative Conference
Members of the 7th Chinese People's Political Consultative Conference